Epilachna decemmaculata, is a species of lady beetle found in India, Bhutan, China (Tibet), Taiwan, Sri Lanka and Myanmar.

Description
Pronotum consists with a rather large, transverse black spots. Scutellum much paler. Elytra testaceous or light reddish brown. In each elytrae, there are five black spots. The humeral spot is slightly emarginate towards the suture. Legs pale.

References 

Coccinellidae
Insects of Sri Lanka
Beetles described in 1844